The following is a list of mountains in Ningxiang City, Hunan Province, China.

List

References

 

 
Geography of Ningxiang